The Wool Warehouse, on E. Bridger in Bridger, Montana, was built around 1900.  It was listed on the National Register of Historic Places in 1987.

It was built and owned by the Northern Pacific Railway Company.  It is a large wood-frame building on a concrete foundation, adjacent to the railroad bed of a former Northern Pacific line.

In 1899, a million pounds of wool was shipped from Carbon County and Montana was the leading wool producer in the world during the first decade of the 1900s, with Carbon County ranked ninth in county contributions in the state.  Half of the assessed value of all property in the county was in cattle and sheep, in 1904.

An elevated portion of the building was added on, in the 1920s, when the warehouse was converted to a bean cleaning facility.

It has also been known as the Glidden Mercantile Warehouse.

References

Warehouses on the National Register of Historic Places
National Register of Historic Places in Carbon County, Montana
Commercial buildings completed in 1900
1900 establishments in Montana
Woollen industry
Northern Pacific Railway
Railway buildings and structures on the National Register of Historic Places in Montana
Commercial buildings on the National Register of Historic Places in Montana